The following is a comprehensive discography of Run-DMC, an American hip hop group.

Run-D.M.C. have had hit singles across the globe from Australia and New Zealand to Belgium and Ireland. Their biggest hit outside of the US was the Jason Nevins remix of "It's Like That".

Albums

Studio albums

Compilation albums

Live albums

Singles

As lead artist

As featured artist

References

Notes

Citations

Discographies of American artists
Hip hop discographies
Discography